Irene Bennett Brown is an American author of children's, young adult and adult fiction. Brown was born in Topeka, Kansas and when she was nine years old, moved with her family from Kansas to the Willamette Valley in Oregon.

Brown's fourth book, To Rainbow Valley, became the first one to sell and be published in 1969. It was re-released as an Easy Reader book in 2001.

Brown has her own publishing company, Riveredge Books, which has published and re-issued several of her books. Brown is a member of Western Writers of America and is a founding member of Women Writing the West. She continues to live in Oregon with her husband, Bob.

Works 
Children's and young adult books'To Rainbow Valley (1969 and 2000)Skitterbrain (1978)Run from a Scarecrow (1978)Willow Whip (1979)Morning Glory Afternoon (1981)Before the Lark (1982)Just Another Gorgeous Guy (1984)Answer Me, Answer Me (1985)I Loved You, Logan McGee (1987)

Adult novelsThe Plainswoman (1994)
Women of Paragon Springs SeriesLong Road Turning (2000)Blue Horizons (2001)No Other Place (2002)Reap the South Wind (2002)Haven (2003)The Bargain'' (2007)

Awards and recognition 
Western Writers of America Spur Award Juvenile 1982 – Before the Lark
Mark Twain Award nomination 1984-85 – Before the Lark 
Evelyn Sibley Lampman Award 1988
Western Writers of America Spur Award finalist – The Plainswoman

References 

Mark Twain Award (https://web.archive.org/web/20090430115709/http://www.maslonline.org/awards/books/MarkTwain/)
Western Writers of America (https://web.archive.org/web/20050901053348/http://www.westernwriters.org/)
Evelyn Sibley Lampman Award (http://www.olaweb.org/mc/page.do?sitePageId=61735 )

Writers from Oregon
Living people
Year of birth missing (living people)